Burp or BURP may refer to:
Burping, release of gas from the digestive tract through the mouth (often referred as a belch)
Big and Ugly Rendering Project, volunteer computing project using BOINC
BURP domain, group of amino acid proteins
Burp suite, computer security application
Harry Hill's TV Burp, British television comedy programme
TV Burp (Australian TV series), Australian television comedy program
Basic Using Reverse Polish, programming language used on the PSI Comp 80 computer
brioche-purl stitch, a kind of stitch in brioche knitting
"Burp, the Smelly Alien", a comic strip by Jeremy Banks in Oink!.

See also
GCRT J1745-3009, astronomical object nicknamed a burper
Burpee (disambiguation)
Burp gun, see submachine gun